Boyd Big Tree Preserve Conservation Area is a  Pennsylvania state park in Lower Paxton and Middle Paxton Townships in Dauphin County, Pennsylvania. The land for the conservation area was donated to the state by real estate developer Alex Boyd in 1999. Boyd Big Tree Preserve Conservation Area is a sanctuary for mature trees and an environment education study area. The park is on Blue Mountain just off Pennsylvania Route 443.

Conservation Area
A conservation area is different from a state park. Conservation areas have much less development on the lands than a state park. They are large tracts of land with few improvements, a lack of through roads and the recreational facilities are minimal. There is an effort to manage the resources with minimal development of the park, and camping is not permitted. Other conservation areas in Pennsylvania are the nearby Joseph E. Ibberson Conservation Area and Varden Conservation Area in Wayne County.

Wildlife
The large mature trees and thick woods of Boyd Big Tree Preserve Conservation Area make it and ideal habitat for a large variety of woodland creatures. The park is home to white-tailed deer, black bear, wild turkeys, ruffed grouse and eastern gray squirrels. Bluebirds and warblers can also be observed at Boyd Big Tree Preserve Conservation Area. There is an observation area on Blue Mountain where bird watchers can see the annual migration of hawks.

Recreation

Trails
All  of trails at Boyd Big Tree Preserve Conservation Area are open to hiking and cross-country skiing.

It is marked with yellow blazes and is a designated "easy" trail. Coach Trail runs along the base of Blue Mountain to the western edge of the park.
It is marked with blue blazes and is a designated "moderate" trail. Creek Trail follows the western edge of the park.
It is marked with lime green blazes and is a designated "moderate" trail. East Loop Trail is on the eastern end of the park.
It is marked with red blazes and is a designated "difficult" trail. Janie Trail is the longest trail in the park and follows the ridgeline and descends the mountain on a steep slope.
It is marked with beige blazes and is a designated "moderate" trail. Upper Spring Trail passes by some of the largest and oldest oak, hickory, and beech trees in the park.
It is marked with lavender blazes and is a designated "easy" trail. Lower Spring Trail passes through the center of the conservation area.
It is marked with pink blazes and is a designated "easy" trail. Pond Loop Trail circles a spring fed pond that is home to many types of amphibians.

Hunting
Hunters are expected to follow the rules and regulations of the Pennsylvania Game Commission. The common game species are ruffed grouse, eastern gray squirrel, wild turkey, white-tailed deer, eastern cottontail rabbits and American black bear. The hunting of groundhogs is prohibited.

Nearby state parks
The following state parks are within  of Boyd Big Tree Preserve Conservation Area:
Gifford Pinchot State Park (York County)
Joseph E. Ibberson Conservation Area (Dauphin County)
Little Buffalo State Park (Perry County)
Memorial Lake State Park (Lebanon County)
Swatara State Park (Lebanon and Schuylkill counties)

References

External links

  

1999 establishments in Pennsylvania
Conservation areas of the United States
Protected areas established in 1999
Protected areas of Dauphin County, Pennsylvania
State parks of Pennsylvania